Mian Muhammad Rashid (born 1 May 1948) is a Pakistani politician who had been a member of the National Assembly of Pakistan, from June 2013 to May 2018.

Early life
He was born on 1 May 1948.

Political career

He was elected to the National Assembly of Pakistan as a candidate of Pakistan Muslim League (N) (PML-N) from Constituency NA-115 (Narowal-I) in 2013 Pakistani general election. He received 71,139 votes and defeated an independent candidate, Muhammad Irfan Abid.

In May 2018, he quit PML-N and joined Pakistan Tehreek-e-Insaf (PTI).

References

Living people
Punjabi people
Pakistani MNAs 2013–2018
1948 births